Waterville may refer to:

Places

Canada
 Waterville, Quebec
 Waterville, Nova Scotia
 Waterville, Carleton County, New Brunswick, a rural community
 Waterville, Sunbury County, New Brunswick, a rural community
 Waterville, Newfoundland and Labrador

Ireland
 Waterville, County Kerry
 Waterville, Dublin

United States
 Waterville (Waterbury), a neighborhood in Connecticut
 Waterville, Iowa
 Waterville, Kansas
 Waterville, Maine
 Waterville, Minnesota
 Waterville, New York
 Waterville, Ohio
 Waterville, Pennsylvania
 Waterville, Tennessee
 Waterville, Texas
 Waterville, Vermont
 Waterville, Washington
 Waterville, Wisconsin
 Waterville USA, a water and amusement park in Alabama
 Waterville Valley, New Hampshire

Other
 Waterville (baseball), a minor league baseball team

See also
 Waterville Airport (disambiguation)
 Waterville Township (disambiguation)